Uncinia uncinata, the Hawai'i birdcatching sedge, hook grass, hook sedge, bastard grass, kamu or matau-a-maui, is a species of flowering plant in the sedge family, Cyperaceae.

Uncinia uncinata is native to New Zealand (including the Antipodes), the Society Islands, and Hawaii.

References

uncinata
Flora of New Zealand
Flora of the Society Islands
Flora of Hawaii
Plants described in 1782